{{Taxobox
| name = Domestic drywood termite
| regnum = Animalia
| phylum = Arthropoda
| classis = Insecta
| ordo = Blattodea
| infraordo = Isoptera
| familia = Kalotermitidae
| genus = Cryptotermes
| species = C. domesticus
| binomial = Cryptotermes domesticus
| binomial_authority = (Haviland, 1898)
| synonyms = *Calotermes domesticus <small>Haviland & Sharp, 1896, nomen nudum</small> Calotermes domesticus Haviland, 1898 Calotermes (Cryptotermes) formosae Holmgren, 1912Calotermes kotoensis Oshima, 1912Calotermes (Cryptotermes) ogasawaraensis Oshima, 1913Calotermes (Cryptotermes) dentatus Oshima, 1914Cryptotermes campbelli Light,1924Cryptotermes hermsi Kirby, 1925Calotermes (Cryptotermes) buxtoni Hill, 1926Kalotermes (Cryptotermes) breviarticulatus Snyder, 1926Calotermes (Cryptotermes) gulosus Hill, 1927Calotermes (Cryptotermes) repentinus Hill, 1927Calotermes (Cryptotermes) torresi Hill, 1927Calotermes (Cryptotermes) lignarius Jepson, 1931, nomen nudumCalotermes (Cryptotermes) tectus Jepson, 1931, nomen nudum
}}

The domestic drywood termite, (Cryptotermes domesticus), is a species of dry wood termite of the genus Cryptotermes''. It is native to Malaysia, Borneo, Australia, China and Sri Lanka. It is mainly a house termite and also found in cultivated areas. The presence of this termite can be identified by small heaps of tiny egg-like pellets of excreta. It is a larger termite species, with 3.25-5.90mm in soldiers. It is considered as a minor pest in Australia, but is a serious pest causing wood damage in other parts of the world.

Description
Imago - General body color is pale yellowish brown. Head is paler than other parts. Wings hyaline or faintly tinged with brown. Eyes comparatively large and distinct. Antennae composed of 15-16 segments. Head and pronotum with mild hairs.
Soldier - Head color varies from very dark brown to black. Head capsule is glabrous. Well developed genal horns present. Antennae composed of 9-15 segments.

References

External links
drywood termite Cryptotermes domesticus Haviland Images

Progress of Biological Studies on Primary Reproductives in Cryptotermes domesticus (Isoptera: Kalotermitidae)

Termites
Insects described in 1898
Invertebrates of Malaysia